Banksia pteridifolia, commonly known as tangled honeypot, is a species of shrub that is endemic to the southwest of Western Australia. It has short, underground stems, deeply pinnatipartite leaves with sharply-pointed, linear lobes on the sides, creamy white or yellow flowers in heads of about one hundred and later up to five follicles in each head.

Description
Between ninety and one hundred creamy white, yellow or pinkish flowers are arranged in heads on the end of the stems, the heads surrounded by leaves. Flowering occurs from March to May or from September to October.

Taxonomy
Scottish botanist Robert Brown described the tangled honeypot as Dryandra pteridifolia in 1810, after collecting it in January 1802 from Lucky Bay on Western Australia's south coast. The description was published in Transactions of the Linnean Society of London.

In 1996, Alex George described two subspecies, subsp. pteridifolia and subsp. vernalis in the journal Nuytsia and in a later volume of the same journal, George described subspecies inretita.

In 2007 Austin Mast and Kevin Thiele transferred all dryandras to the genus Banksia and renamed this species Banksia pteridifolia and the subspecies pteridifolia, vernalis and inretita respectively. The names of the subspecies are accepted by the Australian Plant Census.

Banksia pteridifolia subsp. inretita differs from the other two in having the flower heads surrounded by short leaves with thread-like lobes. The other two subspecies do not have short leaves around the heads. Banksia pteridifolia subsp. pteridifolia has twisted leaf lobes, and flowers in autumn whereas B. pteridifolia subsp. vernalis has leaf lobes that are only slightly twisted, if at all, and flowers in spring.

Distribution and habitat
All three subspecies of B. pteridifolia grow in kwongan. Subspecies inretita occurs between Lake Grace and Lake King. Subspecies pteridifolia is found between the Gairdner River, Cape Le Grand National Park and Newdegate and subsp. vernalis between Eneabba, the Moore River and Perth.

Conservation status
Subspecies pteridifolia is listed as "not threatened" by the Western Australian Government Department of Parks and Wildlife but subsp. inretita is listed as "Priority Two" meaning that it is poorly known and from only one or a few locations and subsp. vernalis as "Priority Three" meaning that it is poorly known and known from only a few locations but is not under imminent threat.

References

pteridifolia
Eudicots of Western Australia
Endemic flora of Western Australia
Plants described in 1810
Taxa named by Robert Brown (botanist, born 1773)